Jai Prakash (born 1 January 1958) is an Indian wrestler. He competed in the men's freestyle 90 kg at the 1984 Summer Olympics.

References

1958 births
Living people
Indian male sport wrestlers
Olympic wrestlers of India
Wrestlers at the 1984 Summer Olympics
Place of birth missing (living people)
Commonwealth Games medallists in wrestling
Commonwealth Games bronze medallists for India
Wrestlers at the 1982 Commonwealth Games
20th-century Indian people
21st-century Indian people
Medallists at the 1982 Commonwealth Games